James Latham (c. 1696 – 26 January 1747) was an Irish portrait painter.

Biography 
James Latham was born in Thurles, County Tipperary, in the Kingdom of Ireland. Possibly related to the family of Lathams of Meldrum and Ballysheehan. After some practice of his art, Latham studied for an academic year in Antwerp (1724–25) where he became a Master of the Guild of St Luke. He returned to Dublin by 1725, and may have visited England in the 1740s, as the influence of Joseph Highmore, as well as Charles Jervas and William Hogarth, is evident in his work of this period. Anthony Pasquin memorably dubbed Latham "Ireland's Van Dyck". Latham died in Dublin on 26 January 1747.

Several of James Latham's portraits are in the National Gallery of Ireland collection in Dublin; one is of the famous MP Charles Tottenham (1694–1758) of New Ross, Co. Wexford, "Tottenham in his Boots" (Cat. No.411) and a second is a portrait of Bishop Robert Clayton (1697–1758) and his wife Katherine (Cat. No. 4370). In 1947 the London Tate Gallery purchased Latham's portrait of Sir Capel Molyneux (ref. N05801), two centuries after the artist's death in Dublin.

References 
 Anthony Pasquin, Memoirs of the Royal Academicians and An Authentic History of the Professors of Painting, Sculpture and Architecture who have Practised in Ireland, 1796
 W. G. Strickland, Dictionary of Irish Artists, 1913
 A. Crookshank & the Knight of Glin, The Painters of Ireland c. 1660–1920, pp. 38–44, 1978
 Elizabeth Einberg and Judy Egerton, The Age of Hogarth: British Painters Born 1675–1709, 1988

External links

1696 births
1747 deaths
People from County Tipperary
18th-century Irish painters
Irish male painters
Painters from Antwerp